The Abia State Chief of Staff is the most senior political appointee and an executive branch of the Abia State Government. Appointed by the Governor of Abia State, the Chief of Staff acts as a senior aide to the Governor with the responsibility of assisting and advising the Governor in the administering and managing of the daily affairs of the government.

List of Chiefs of Staff

See also
Government of Abia State

References

Executive Council of Abia State
Chiefs of staff